Ballion is a surname. Notable people with the name include:

Ernst von Ballion (1816–1901), Russian entomologist
Susan Ballion or Siouxsie Sioux (born 1957), English singer, songwriter and musician

See also
Ballon (surname)